Gwladys Nocera (born 22 May 1975) is a French professional golfer. She currently resides in Biarritz, France.

Amateur career 
Nocera was born  in Moulins, Allier. She had a successful amateur career. She finished runner up at the 1998 British Ladies Amateur Championship, was a member of the victorious European championship French team in 1999 and the youngest ever winning captain in the 2000 Espirito Santo Trophy (World Amateur Golf Team Championships). She was a playing member of the 2002 French Espirito Santo Trophy team.

She was runner up at the 2002 French Amateur Championship, 2002 French International Champion and 2002 German International champion. She holds a degree in international business from New Mexico State University.

Professional career 

Nocera turned professional at the relatively late age of twenty-seven and finished ninth at the 2002 Ladies European Tour Qualifying School to win a place on the tour for the following season. After a modest start she improved dramatically in 2005, when she finished fourth on the Order of Merit and made her Solheim Cup debut where she beat Cristie Kerr in her singles match.

In 2006 her career took another upward turn. She started the year representing France at the Women's World Cup of Golf with Karine Icher. She scored her first three Ladies European Tour tournament victories at the Ladies Swiss Open, the BMW Ladies Italian Open and the Catalonia Ladies Masters. She also played in her first women's major tournament, the Kraft Nabisco Championship. She finished second on the New Star Money list being beaten only by Laura Davies the holder of the record number of money list wins and was voted Players’ Player of the Year by her fellow Ladies European Tour professionals.

On 20 January 2008, Jennifer Rosales and Dorothy Delasin of Team Philippines won the 4th Women's World Cup of Golf in Sun City, South Africa, with 4 birdies in the last 4 holes. The duo had a final round of 7-under-par 65 in the best ball, for a 54-hole aggregate of 18-under-par 198. Korea's Ji-Yai Shin and Eun Hee Ji were second on 200 after a final round 67, while Taiwan (Amy Hung and Yun Jye Wei) and Japan (Shinobu Moromizato and Miki Saiki) tied for third on 203. France's Gwladys Nocera and Virginie Lagoutte-Clement, were fifth on 205 following 67.

In 2009, Nocera earned her LPGA Tour card at LPGA Q-School and at the age of 34 will be a rookie and full-time LPGA Tour member in the 2010 season.

LET 72-hole scoring record
Nocera won the 2008 Göteborg Masters by an 11 stroke margin after scoring 259 (−29) following rounds of 66-62-65-66, the best 72-hole score in the LET's 40-year history. The bogey-free round of 62 is only one stroke off the LET single round scoring record of 61 (−11).

Source:

Amateur wins (2)
 2002 (2) French International Ladies Amateur Championship, German International Championship

Professional wins (15)

Ladies European Tour (14)

ALPG Tour (1)

Ladies European Tour career summary

Team appearances
Amateur
European Ladies' Team Championship (representing France): 1997, 1999 (winners), 2001
Espirito Santo Trophy (representing France): 2000 (non-playing captain, winners), 2002

Professional
Solheim Cup (representing Europe): 2005, 2007, 2009, 2015
World Cup (representing France): 2006, 2007, 2008
The Queens (representing Europe): 2015, 2017 (captain)

Solheim Cup record

See also
List of golfers with most Ladies European Tour wins
Ladies European Tour records

Notes and references

External links 

French female golfers
Ladies European Tour golfers
LPGA Tour golfers
Solheim Cup competitors for Europe
Olympic golfers of France
Golfers at the 2016 Summer Olympics
Mediterranean Games medalists in golf
Mediterranean Games silver medalists for France
Competitors at the 1997 Mediterranean Games
Sportspeople from Moulins, Allier
Sportspeople from Biarritz
1975 births
Living people